Robert Arthur White (born 6 October 1936) is a former English first-class cricketer and umpire.

Cricket career

Player
White joined the Lord's staff at 15 after leaving school. In 1955 and 1956 he did his National Service, mainly in Cyprus. 

He made his county debut in 1958 with Middlesex, where he played as a batsman. He had his most successful season in 1963 when he scored 1355 runs, the only time he reached 1000 runs in a season. He was awarded his county cap during the season.

In 1966 White moved to Nottinghamshire, where he developed his off-spin and played as an all-rounder. His best bowling season was 1971, when he was the county's most successful bowler. He took 81 wickets, and achieved his best figures of 7 for 41 against Derbyshire; he had taken 10 wickets for 51 in the match when rain washed out play early on the third day. He made his highest score of 116 not out against Surrey in 1967, when he and Mike Smedley set a Nottinghamshire record of 204 for the seventh wicket after the score had been 64 for 6. 

In his final years at Nottinghamshire, White was manager and captain of the Second XI. In his second-last first-class match, against Derbyshire in 1980, he took 4 for 33 in the first innings and 6 for 24 in the second, when Nottinghamshire dismissed Derbyshire for 54 and won by 89 runs.

Umpire
In 1983 White began an 19-year career as a first-class umpire. He umpired 314 first-class and 323 List A matches before retiring after the 2001 season. His most important appointments were to umpire several quarter-finals of the county one-day competitions.

References

1936 births
Living people
English cricketers
Middlesex cricketers
Nottinghamshire cricketers
English cricket umpires
People from Fulham
Marylebone Cricket Club cricketers
International Cavaliers cricketers